Prabhu Mundkur is an Indian film actor who hails from Manipal. He started his career with Kannada television soap Kulavadhu in 2016. His movie debut happened in 2017 through Urvi, a critically acclaimed movie in the Kannada film industry.

Early life and family 

Prabhu Mundkur was born on 5 December 1988 to a Konkani speaking orthodox family in Manipal, in Udupi. He completed his schooling at Bangalore and Udupi and graduated from St. Aloysius College, Mangalore. He also holds a post graduate degree in Applied Microbiology from the University of Madras. Prior to pursuing acting, he worked as a research scientist for Biocon and ITC Limited. He married Kavita Kudtarkar (Nakshatra Prabhu) in 2012 and they have a daughter and twin boy and girl.

Film career 

Prior to his acting career, Prabhu undertook modelling assignments with regional apparel brands. He began working for theater and short films; he played the lead in Meendum Orumurai, a Tamil language short film released in 2016. He underwent training at Usha Bhandari's film institute in 2014 and after a couple of years of acting in minor characters, he was called up for a role in 2016's critically acclaimed Kannada film Urvi.

Filmography

References

External links 
 

Living people
1988 births